Agrotera magnificalis is a moth in the family Crambidae. It was described by George Hampson in 1893. It is found in Sri Lanka and on Sumbawa in Indonesia.

References

Moths described in 1893
Spilomelinae
Moths of Sri Lanka
Moths of Indonesia